Lizards (or Lizards!) is a closed-end, computer moderated, play-by-mail role-playing wargame.

History and development
Lizards was designed by Jonathan Bean, and published in Australia by Roma. It was also published by Circle in New Zealand and Madhouse in the United Kingdom, and Guerilleros Associes in France as of 1996. Flying Buffalo, Inc. published the game in the United States. This low-complexity game was closed-ended and computer moderated. The game's rulebook was high-quality with a color cover—unusual for a PBM game. It had humor woven throughout.

Gameplay
Lizards is a wargame involving fighting clans of lizards. Players led individual clans. 16 total players vied for victory on a 32×32 hex map. Besides other players, the setting contained various living and nonliving lethal threats to players, from sea monsters to volcanoes. Five types of lizards were available for players: (1) red lizards, or troops, (2) green lizards, or farmers, (3) black lizards, or spellcasters, (4) grey lizards, or builders, and (5) spies, which could be any color.

Reception
A commentator in 1996 found the game entertaining but suffered from slow clan movement rates. A reviewer in a 1996 issue of Flagship said it was "A good game", although he thought the gameplay was simple, which could appeal to some players.

See also
 List of play-by-mail games

References

Bibliography

 
 
 
 
 

Multiplayer games
Play-by-mail games